Platyceps sinai is a species of snake of the family Colubridae. It is commonly known as the Coluber sinai.

Geographic range
The snake is found in the Middle East.

References

Reptiles of the Middle East
Snakes of Jordan
sinai